The Fifth Avenue Transportation Company was a transportation company based in New York which was founded in 1885 and operated of horse-and-omninbus transit along Fifth Avenue, with a route running from 89th Street to Bleecker Street using horse-drawn omnibuses. Fifth Avenue was unusual in that its residents opposed the installation of railway track for streetcars and was the only avenue in Manhattan to never see streetcar service. The company was declared bankrupt of the earlier operator in 1896, and was succeeded by the Fifth Avenue Coach Company

From 1888 until his death in 1893, lawyer Elliott Fitch Shepard was the company's controlling stockholder. He acted on his religious beliefs of the holiness of the Christian Sabbath, forcing the company to halt its operations on Sunday, the Sabbath.

References

Surface transportation in Greater New York
1896 disestablishments in New York (state)
Bus transportation in New York City

Defunct companies based in New York (state)
Defunct public transport operators in the United States
American companies established in 1885
Transport companies established in 1885
1885 establishments in New York (state)